"E.G. Summer Rider" (stylized as "E.G. summer RIDER"; stands for "E-girls Summer Rider") is a song recorded and performed by Japanese collective unit E-girls, taken as a single from their fourth studio record E.G. Crazy (2017). The track was released on July 20, 2016, through Rhythm Zone and Avex Music Creative Inc. in three physical formats—two CD's and a DVD bundle—and for digital consumption. The song was written by Kotake Masato, composed by Henrik Nordenback, Christian Fast and Lisa Desmond, and produced by Nordenback with Exile's Hiro.

"E.G. Summer Rider" serves as the opening entry for their E.G. Pop concept, which utilizes a fun and poppier. Musically, it is a J-pop number that incorporates elements of dance and dubstep, and delves into themes of having fun and the summer season. Additionally, the physical and digital packaging included the B-sides: "Kikai Shikake no Bye Bye!" and "Party In The Sun", and a Clarabell remix of the band's promotional recording "Strawberry Sadistic". "E.G. Summer Rider" is the group's first single to feature all remaining vocalists since "E.G. Anthem: We Are Venus" (2014).

Upon its release, "E.G. Summer Rider" received positive reviews from music critics, who commended the tracks sound and production, with additional compliments aimed towards their E.G. Pop concept. Commercially, it experienced success in Japan, peaking at number two on the Oricon Singles Chart and on the Japan Hot 100, the latter published by Billboard. In order to promote the single, E-girls performed in the accompanying music video, which was directed by Shigeaki Kubo, and had the band going on a road trip. Additionally, the girls sung and performed the track on several concert and shows.

Background and composition
After the band's new line-up changes in 2015, as managed by LDH, E-girls released three new singles; "Anniversary!!" (May 2015), "Dance Dance Dance" (September 2016) and "Merry x Merry Xmas" (December 2015). Furthermore, after distributing the promotional recording, "Dance With Me Now!", in December that year, LDH re-added vocalist Yuzuna Takebe to the girl group, and published their first greatest hits retrospect E.G. Smile: E-girls Best in February 2016. In June that year, E-girls announced on their website about two new singles: "E.G. Summer Rider" and "Pink Champagne". Each release would commemorate a separate concept: E.G. Pop and E.G. Cool. The former track incorporated the E.G. Pop concept, which was described by their management as a combination of a "fun" and "pop[pier]" vibe. It is also the first physical single to not include member Erie Abe, whom transitioned to an accompanying disc jockey to specific songs.

The song was written by Kotake Masato, composed by Henrik Nordenback, Christian Fast and Lisa Desmond, and produced by Nordenback with Exile's Hiro. Musically, it is a J-pop number that incorporates elements of dance and dubstep, and delves into themes of having fun and the summer season. Will from Arama Japan agreed, noting that it was a pop song that was set with a "summer theme." According to a contributing editor of CD Journal, they felt that the single presented a "dynamic" dance sound, but also utilized a somewhat "surprisingly restrained emotion" through their vocal performances and lyrical content. All vocalist members are featured in this single, marking their first-full singing appearances together since 2014's "E.G. Anthem: We Are Venus". Accompanying the single are two B-sides: "Kikai Shikake no Bye Bye!" and "Party In The Sun", and a Clarabell remix of the band's promotional recording "Strawberry Sadistic", all which are included on the physical and digital distributions. Composed as pop and dance numbers, the first two songs feature the remaining vocalists, whilst "Strawberry Sadistic" omits Takebe.

Release
"E.G. Summer Rider" was taken as a single from their fourth studio record E.G. Crazy (2017) where it featured on the E.G. Pop disc. The track was released on July 20, 2016, through Rhythm Zone and Avex Music Creative Inc. in three physical formats—two CD's and a DVD bundle—and for digital consumption. The standard CD release, and DVD bundle included all fours songs; the former formats featured its instrumental compositions, while the DVD only placed the single's instrumental as track number five, and a bonus disc featured the music video. A special One-Coin edition was made available on their website with limited pressings, only including the single and a promotional trading card that ranged from 20 different kinds. "E.G. Summer Rider" was made for digital consumption that same day, but included the first four songs. The cover art featured all members except Erie Abe; the separate CD and One-Coin editions featured each member placed randomly on a white backdrop, while the DVD package feature all members placed in a separate square that made up a 5x5 column/row. Japanese retail store CDJapan had issued first-press editions that included a trading card, and an LP-size poster that depicted the CD+DVD cover art.

Reception
Upon its release, "E.G. Summer Rider" received positive reviews from music critics. A contributing editor of CD Journal was positive towards it production, and praised the single's E.G. Pop concept. The review also commended the additional B-side tracks for giving the release a more "exciting" package. Although describing the sound as "dry", the editor felt it worked with the "elegance" of the group. Similarly, in an article written from SBS PopAsia, head staff enjoyed the recording and felt the song was no "better way to celebrate" the summery season. Staff members at AllMusic was positive, and selected the single, alongside "Party In the Sun!" as some of their best musical releases.

Commercially, "E.G. Summer Rider" experienced success in Japan. It opened at number three on the daily Oricon Singles Chart, and stayed there for six more days, their only single to achieve the same positions consecutively in that category. Based on these positions, the track debuted at number two on the weekly chart with 59,666 copies sold, only just behind KinKi Kids' single "Bara to Taiyou", which earned doubled the sales. The following week saw a drop in sales, slipping to number 41 and selling 3,504 units. In total, it was present for seven weeks and sold 68,176 copies by the end of the year, ranking at number 79.

The single performed well on three component Billboard charts in the same region. It debuted at number 16 on July 4, 2016, but gradually slipped downwards through the next four weeks. On the week of its availability, the single rose to its peak position of number two, where it stayed there for a sole week. Additionally, "E.G. Summer Rider" reached number three on the Radio Songs chart and number two on the Hot Single Sales chart, and garnered a similar run to the Japan Hot 100 chart.

Music video
An accompanying music video was directed by Shigeaki Kubo, which has the band going on a road trip during the summer season. The visual opens with different members on different mobile vehicles on a long bridge. An information sign features several directions, which is filled with positive-comments and phrases; the E-girls and "E.G. Summer Rider" logo pops up in amongst the signs. The first verse situates groups of members in different areas; Reina Washio is singing near a beach-side, Ami, Aya and Ruri Kawamoto are seated eating watermelon and drinking smoothies, Shizuka and Karen Fujii dance to the track, whilst standing underneath a roof made of umbrellas, and Yuzuna Takebe sings in a convertible. As the chorus starts, the group perform on top of stacked platforms whilst underneath a rainbow-colored blow-up castle. These scenes are generate throughout the rest of the song, until it hits the bridge section, where the girls park their vehicles near the information sign and watch the sunset. It ends with a bunch of the members riding on the bridge; additionally, as the scene pans to the sky and turns black, stars light up and pans towards a pink-tinted city, which is in fact the opening for the girls visual "Pink Champagne". The clip received positive reviews from numerous publications. An editor from Arama Japan commended the summery vibe, and labelled it "colorful". In a similar article, staff members from SBS PopAsia complimented its colorful style and story. Additionally, the article stated: "the "E.G. Summer Rider" [music video] is a fun little tribute to the Summer months that's bound to warm you up as much as standing out in the sun!"

Promotion and live performances
In order to promote the single, E-girls partook in the Japanese make-up company Kose, which promoted a various range of mascara and make-up tools; members and sisters Karen and Shuuka Fujii appeared in the commercial which premiered on July 22, 2016. The band made an appearance at the MBS Music Festival, where they served as the opening act; they performed "Dance With Me Now!" and "E.G. Summer Rider". Since its release, it made its first concert appearance on the band's E.G. Smile tour, which commenced that same year; it appeared on the triple DVD/Blu-ray set of E.G. Crazy (2017).

Track listing and formats

CD single
"E.G. Summer Rider" – 4:29
"Kikai Shikake no Bye Bye!"  – 3:43
"Party in the Sun" – 3:15
"Strawberry Sadistic" (Clarabell Remix) – 4:14
"E.G. Summer Rider" (Instrumental) – 4:29
"Kikai Shikake no Bye Bye!"  [Instrumental] – 3:43
"Party in the Sun" (Instrumental) – 3:15

DVD single
"E.G. Summer Rider" – 4:29
"Kikai Shikake no Bye Bye!"  – 3:43
"Party in the Sun" – 3:15
"Strawberry Sadistic" (Clarabell Remix) – 4:14
"E.G. Summer Rider" (Instrumental) – 4:29
"E.G. Summer Rider" (music video)

One Coin CD
"E.G. Summer Rider" – 4:29

Digital EP
"E.G. Summer Rider" – 4:29
"Kikai Shikake no Bye Bye!"  – 3:43
"Party in the Sun" – 3:15
"Strawberry Sadistic" (Clarabell Remix) – 4:14

Credits and personnel
Credits adapted from the CD liner notes of the single.

Vocalists

Shizuka – vocals, background vocals
Aya – vocals, background vocals, leader
Ami – vocals, background vocals
Karen Fujii – vocals, background vocals
Ruri Kawamoto – vocals, background vocals
Reina Washio – vocals, background vocals
Yuzuna Takabe – vocals, background vocals

Performers

Sayaka – performer
Kaede – performer
Karen Fujii – performer
Miyuu – performer
Yurino – performer
Anna Suda – performer
Shuuka Fujii – performer
Manami Shigetome – performer
Mio Nakajima – performer
Nozomi Bando – performer
Harumi Sato – performer
Anna Ishii – performer
Nonoka Yamaguchi – performer
Yuzuna Takabe – performer

Music credits

Masato Kotake – songwriter 
Hendrik Nordenback – composer, producer 
Christian Fast – composer 
Lisa Desmond – composer 
Clarabell – composer, remixer 
Shoko Fujibayashi – songwriter 
Rinat Arinos – composer 
Daniel Brecher – composer 
Jon Ernst – composer 
Exile Hiro – producer 
Shigeaki Kubo – music video director

Charts and sales

Japanese charts

Year-end chart

Sales

|-
! scope="row"| Japan (RIAJ)
| 
| 68,176
|-
|}

Release history

Notes

References

External links
"E.G. Summer Rider" at the official E-girls websites. 

2016 songs
2016 singles
Avex Trax singles
Rhythm Zone singles
E-girls songs